The Train Express Regional (TER) is an airport rail link in Senegal that connects Dakar with the Blaise Diagne International Airport. It was built by French companies Engie and Thales Group. The contract is valued at €2 billion.

History

Construction on the TER began in the third quarter of 2016 and is expected to be fully completed at the end of 2023.

The line will be built in two stages, with the first covering 36 km from the city of Dakar to Diamniadio, while the second stage covering 19 km more to the airport.

The first phase of the line was originally inaugurated on 14 January 2019, but regular passenger service running the 13 stations from Dakar to Diamniadio, was inaugurated on 27 December 2021.

Before opening, protests were held by some Dakar citizens who felt they had not been sufficiently compensated by the government after their homes and businesses were demolished during the line's construction.

Stations 

 Dakar
 Hann
 Thiaroye
 Mbao
 Rufisque
 Bargny
 Diamniadio
 Blaise Diagne International Airport

Rolling stock 
 15 four-car Coradia Polyvalent trainsets The trainsets are mainline dual-mode trains (diesel and electric 25 kV) capable of running at speeds of 160 km/h. Each trainset is 72 metres long with four cars and has a capacity for 531 passengers in two classes (first and second).

Parameters 
 Length: 54 km 
 Stations: 14
 Lines: 1
 Gauge: 
 Voltage: 25 kV AC
 Train size: 4
 Fleet size: 15
 Max speed: 160 km/h

See also 
 Rail transport in Senegal

References 

Dakar
Proposed railway lines
Transport in Senegal
Rail transport in Senegal
25 kV AC railway electrification